The Last Steep Ascent is a Hong Kong television drama produced by TVB under executive producer Lee Tim-sing.

Background
The drama is a fictionalized account of a true love story between an older woman and a younger man in 1930s China. Koo Sun-yuet, the wife of a wealthy businessman, falls in love with Miu Tin, a man eight years her junior. The two elope to the countryside and lives modestly for the remainder of their lives. Before Tin dies, he handcarves a long stair path on the mountain so Yuet can travel down with ease.

Production
A costume fitting press conference was held at TVB City's Studio 1 in Tseung Kwan O on 20 September 2011. The blessing ceremony was held at the studios on 13 October 2011.

Cast
Maggie Cheung Ho-yee as Koo Sun-yuet, the main protagonist. She is the wife of Ho Sai-cheung, a talented businessman in the Chinese medicine wholesaling business. Yuet falls in love with Miu Tin, a man eight years her junior, and the two elope to the countryside for a modest living. It is revealed that she met Miu Tin when he was younger during her journey to her wedding.
Moses Chan as Miu Tin, Yuet's lover who is eight years her junior. He is a peasant hailing from Ngau Yee Village, and plants Chinese herbs and medicine for a living. It is revealed that he met Yuet during his childhood, during which he asked her to touch his gums where he was missing two front teeth, believing that front teeth would grow quickly when a bride touches it.
Kenny Wong as Cheng Kiu, Tin's best friend. His wife died with nobody to help her and Kiu, drinking with his friends, his child also died later regardless of his attempt to save his child. He is shown marrying Oi-tai in the last episode.
Aimee Chan as Tin Oi-tai, a maid from San Francisco, who has an affair with Sai-cheung. She is raped by a man who later comes back to haunt her, whilst she believes that the child she is impregnated with was Sai-cheung's. She eventually has a miscarriage, leading her to fall in love with Kiu who saved her from the rapist who assaulted her. She shares the latter part of her name, Oi-tai, with Kiu's previous wife, questioning if Kiu truly loved her. She is shown to marry Kiu in the last episode.
Edwin Siu as Ho Sai-ho, the main antagonist. He is the son of Kwan-yiu and cousin of Sai-cheung. He attempts to burn down the storage of the business which he took over, in order to escape with his wife and start over, whilst taking the majority of the money. This, however, is foiled by the police.
KK Cheung as Ho Sai-cheung, the husband of Sun-yuet, and the current executive officer of the Ho family's Chinese medicine business, Ho Ching Tong. He is the most powerful and successful figure in the Chinese medicine wholesaling business. He died in episode seven, from his sickness which had dormant since his time in San Francisco, of which he hid from his family.
Law Lan as Leung Mei-kuen, known as Old Mrs. Ho, Ho Sai-cheung's mother, the matriarch of the Ho family.
Cheung Yick as Ho Kwan-yiu, Sai-ho's father and Sai-cheung's elder paternal uncle.
Joel Chan as Lai Chai-man, a young, ambitious businessman who strives to achieve the top spot in the Chinese medicine wholesaling business.
Samantha Ko as Cheng Yim-ping, Chai-man's wife.
Benjamin Yuen as Ho Sai-leung, Sai-cheung's younger brother.
Katy Kung as Ho Sai-man, Sai-cheung and Sai-leung's younger sister.
Mat Yeung as Ngai Po-law, Sai-man's husband.
Tsui Wing as Kwan Kwong-tat, known as Blackie Tat, one of Tin's friend.
Yvonne Ho as Kong Pik-kei, Sai-ho's wife.
Yeung Ching-wah as Liu Sam-kan, one of Tin's friend.
Raymond Chiu as Suen Man-wah, an office clerk personally hired by Sai-cheung.
Eddie Li as Ho Yan Lung, the founder of the Chinese medicine business, Ho Ching Tong, and Ho Kwan Yiu's father.
Yu Tze Ming as Chung Kam, Ngau Yee Village's village chief.
Kaki Leung as Chung Lok-ho, the daughter of Kam.
Jim Tang as Lau Kar-ming, a schoolteacher and the boyfriend of Lok-ho.
Chuk Man-kwan as Aunt Hung, Mrs. Ho's maid.
Yueh Hua as Miu Hoi, Tin's father, died shortly after his wife died.
Suet Nei as Tsui Siu-mui, Tin's mother, shown to die naturally in the beginning.

Ho Family tree

Awards and nominations
2012 TVB Anniversary Awards:
Nominated: Best Drama
Nominated: Best Actor (Moses Chan) - Top 5
Nominated: Best Actress (Aimee Chan)
Nominated: Best Supporting Actor (Kenny Wong)
Nominated: Best Supporting Actress (Helena Law)
Nominated: My Favourite Male Character (Moses Chan)
Nominated: Most Improved Male Artiste (Edwin Siu)
Nominated: Most Improved Female Artiste (Katy Kung)

Viewership ratings
The following is a table that includes a list of the total ratings points based on television viewership.

References

External links
Official TVB website
6,000 Steps to Paradise

TVB dramas
2012 Hong Kong television series debuts
2012 Hong Kong television series endings
Hong Kong romance television series
2010s romance television series
2010s Hong Kong television series